The Palace of the General Council (French: Palais du conseil général) is the base of the Departmental Council of Guadeloupe.

History 
It was built by architect Ali Tur in 1935. It was the last building he designed in the archipelago.

On 15 December 1997, the palace was listed as a historic monument.

References 

Legislative buildings
Monuments historiques of Guadeloupe
Buildings and structures completed in 1935
Government buildings completed in 1935
1935 establishments in France